Edith Hoyt (April 10 1894–1971) was an American painter.  Hoyt painted primarily landscapes, cityscapes and floral watercolors.

Life and work
Edith Hoyt was born in West Point, New York in April 1894. She attended the Corcoran School of the Arts and Design, studying under painter Charles Herbert Woodbury.  Starting in 1921, Hoyt spent summers in Canada, specifically in Jasper National Park and in Gaspé, Quebec. Her work was exhibited at the Corcoran, American Watercolor Society, Pennsylvania Academy and Brooklyn Museum. In 1963, she worked and exhibited in Cap-à-l'Aigle, Canada, in 1963. In 1932, Hoyt was invited to the Howard University Gallery event Presenting Works of Negro Artists to talk on her experiences in Jasper national park. One of her paintings was allegedly requested by the Little Rock Ark art association the prior week.

Collections
The Ice Bridge at St. Petronille, IO, oil on canvas, 1941, Musée national des beaux-arts du Québec
Winter Scene Ste Pétronille, I.O., oil on canvas, 1941, Musée national des beaux-arts du Québec

References

1894 births
1971 deaths
20th-century American women artists
20th-century American painters
American watercolorists
American women painters
Painters from New York (state)
Painters from Washington, D.C.
People from West Point, New York 
Women watercolorists